Theatre of Fate is the second album by Brazilian heavy metal band Viper. It was re-released in 1997 by Paradoxx Music in a 2-in-1 edition with the Soldiers of Sunrise album.

In a 2013 interview, when commenting on the production and recording of the album, vocalist Andre Matos said:

"Moonlight" is based on Beethoven's "Moonlight Sonata".

Track listing

Personnel
André Matos — vocals
Pit Passarell — bass guitar
Yves Passarell — lead guitar
Felipe Machado — rhythm guitar
Sérgio Facci — drums

References

External links
 Viper official site

1989 albums
Viper (band) albums